Timberlea may refer to:
Timberlea, New Zealand
Timberlea, Nova Scotia, a community in Halifax
Timberlea, Ontario, a community in Milton